Ramón González Expósito (born 25 November 1974), sometimes known as just Ramón, is a Spanish former footballer who played as a central defender, and is a current manager.

Club career
González was born in Malagón, Ciudad Real, Castile-La Mancha. During his professional career he represented Real Valladolid, Atlético Madrid (first and second teams), UD Las Palmas, Córdoba CF, Recreativo de Huelva, Real Murcia and Xerez CD.

Most of González's career was spent in Segunda División, but he did play 101 La Liga matches, the first on 5 September 1993 when Valladolid lost 0–1 at home against Sporting de Gijón. He retired with Andalusia's Xerez at the end of the 2007–08 campaign in the second level, where he appeared in a total of 266 games over ten seasons.

International career
Five youth categories comprised, González earned 41 caps for Spain and scored four goals. He helped the under-17 side finish second in the 1991 FIFA World Championship held in Italy.

Honours
Spain U16
UEFA European Under-16 Championship: 1991

Spain U17
FIFA U-17 World Cup runner-up: 1991

Spain U21
UEFA European Under-21 Championship third place: 1994

References

External links

1974 births
Living people
Sportspeople from the Province of Ciudad Real
Spanish footballers
Footballers from Castilla–La Mancha
Association football defenders
La Liga players
Segunda División players
Real Valladolid players
Atlético Madrid B players
Atlético Madrid footballers
UD Las Palmas players
Córdoba CF players
Recreativo de Huelva players
Real Murcia players
Xerez CD footballers
Spain youth international footballers
Spain under-21 international footballers
Spanish football managers
Primera Federación managers
Segunda División B managers
Tercera División managers
Cultural Leonesa managers